Podence is a former civil parish in the municipality (concelho) of Macedo de Cavaleiros, Portugal. In 2013, the parish merged into the new parish Podence e Santa Combinha. The population in 2011 was 250, in an area of 14.44 km².

Podence is internationally known for its tradition of Careto or Caretos, during the festivities of Carnival when gangs of masked youths terrorize young girls and rob the cellars of the village.

See also
 Azibo Reservoir Protected Landscape

References

External links

Podence in azibo.org
Careto´s Tradition Article by José Paulo Carvalho Pereira in azibo.org, February 2006
University of Louisville Department of Anthropology
Carnival of Podence (in Portuguese)
Endless energy of the Caretos (in Portuguese)

Former parishes of Portugal
Freguesias of Macedo de Cavaleiros